Global Metal is a 2007 documentary film directed by Scot McFadyen and Canadian anthropologist Sam Dunn. It is a follow-up to their successful 2005 documentary, Metal: A Headbanger's Journey. The film's international premiere took place at the Bergen International Film Festival on 17 October 2007. Global Metal aims to show the impact of globalization on the heavy metal underground as well as how different people from different cultures are transforming heavy metal music.

Interviews
As in Metal: A Headbanger's Journey, most of the information in the film comes in the form of interviews:

Rio de Janeiro and São Paulo, Brazil

Non musicians
 Claudia Azevedo, University of Rio de Janeiro
 Eric de Haas, Rock Hard Brazil
 Toninho, Sepultura fan club

Tokyo, Japan

Non musicians
 Masa Itoh, Rock City TV
 Katsuya Minamida, Kobe University

Mumbai and Bangalore, India

Non musicians
 Atul Sharma, MetalIndia.net

Beijing, China

Non musicians
 Wang Xiao, 666 Rock Shop owner
 Yang Yu, Painkiller
 Zhang Feng, MIDI School principal

Jakarta, Indonesia

Non musicians
 Wendi Putranto, Rolling Stone Indonesia
 Jason Tedjasukmana, Time Indonesia
 Franki Raden, professor, York University, Toronto, Canada
 Rudi Iman, fan

Jerusalem, Israel

Non musicians
 Yishai Sweartz, Raven Music
 Maor Appelbaum, producer/engineer

Dubai, United Arab Emirates

Non musicians
 Armin, fan - Iran
 Abed, fan – Lebanon
 Omar Abdula Aziz Mohammed Khan Abdula, fan – Dubai

Songs in the movie

 "Fight Fire With Fire" - Metallica
 "Overkill" - Motörhead
 "Vou Festejar" - Hipnose
 "Coisinha Do Pai" - Hipnose
 "Rock You Like A Hurricane" - Scorpions
 "2 Minutes To Midnight" - Iron Maiden
 "Beneath The Remains" - Sepultura
 "Mass Hypnosis" - Sepultura
 "Roots Bloody Roots" - Sepultura
 "Kaiowas" - Sepultura
 "Walk With Me In Hell" - Lamb of God
 "War Ensemble" - Slayer
 "Highway Star" - Deep Purple
 "Rock And Roll All Nite" - Kiss
 "Elixir" - Marty Friedman
 "Death Panda Death" - Marty Friedman and AKB48
 "Danger Zone That I Want To Eat And Lick" - Sex Machineguns
 "X" - X Japan
 "Art of Life" - X Japan
 "Me Devil" - Sigh
 "Banno Ki Saheli" - Jatin–Lalit, Sandesh Shandilya and Aadesh Shrivastava.
 "Golden Memories"
 "Kalluri Vaanil" - Prabhu Deva
 "Apocalyptic Dawn" - Demonic Resurrection
 "Boiled Unwound Filatured" - Bhayanak Maut
 "Legend" - Spring & Autumn
 "Ritual Day" - Ritual Day
 "Epic" - Tang Dynasty
 "Mo/Monster" - Voodookungfu
 "Damage Inc." - Metallica
 "Inner Self" - Sepultura
 "Creeping Death" - Metallica
 "Parade Luka" - Siksakubur
 "Jihad Soldiers" - Tengkorak
 "Akselerasi Maksimum" - Seringai
 "El Meod Na'ala" - Orphaned Land
 "Morbid Shadow" - Arallu
 "Act of War/Act of Terror" - Salem
 "Angel of Death" - Slayer
 "Ornaments of Gold" - Orphaned Land
 "Daramad"
 "Egyptian Festival"
 "Raining Blood" (Slayer cover) - SDS 
 "Raining Blood" - Slayer
 "Cloud Connected" - In Flames
 "Fear of the Dark" (live in Bangalore, India) - Iron Maiden
 "Hallowed Be Thy Name" (live in Bangalore, India) - Iron Maiden

Soundtrack
There was a soundtrack released on 24 July featuring music from various metal bands all around the world, including bands from Israel, China, India, Indonesia, Iran and Japan

Disc 1
 "Inner Self" - Sepultura (Brazil)
 "Walk with Me in Hell" - Lamb of God (United States)
 "Ladders to Sumeria" - Melechesh (Israel/Netherlands)
 "X" (Live) - X Japan (Japan)
 "Ornaments of Gold" - Orphaned Land (Israel)
 "Crystal Skull" (Live At the Dubai Desert Rock Festival)- Mastodon (United States)
 "Havenless" - Enslaved (Norway)
 "Me-Devil" - Sigh (Japan)
 "Cloud Connected" - (Live At the Dubai Desert Rock Festival) - In Flames (Sweden)

Disc 2
 "Indigenous Laceration" - Chthonic (Taiwan) 
 "Salvation Suicide" - Angra (Brazil) 
 "Jaktens Tid" - Finntroll (Finland) 
 "From The Sky" - Gojira (France) 
 "Epic" - 唐朝 Tang Dynasty (China) 
 "Jihad Soldier" - Tengkorak (Indonesia) 
 "Baptized" - Arthimoth (Iran) 
 "Wings Of Time" - Týr (Faroe Islands) 
 "Apocalyptic Dawn" - Demonic Resurrection (India)

References

External links
 
 
 Film Review

2007 films
English-language Canadian films
Canadian documentary films
Documentary films about heavy metal music and musicians
2007 documentary films
2000s English-language films
2000s Canadian films